Chokeelagee Creek is a stream in the U.S. state of Georgia.

Chokeelagee is a name derived from the Muscogee language meaning "council house stands there creek". Variant names are "Chokeeliga Creek" and "Chokeeligee Creek".

References

Rivers of Georgia (U.S. state)
Rivers of Lee County, Georgia
Rivers of Sumter County, Georgia
Rivers of Terrell County, Georgia